Helen is a novel by Maria Edgeworth (1767–1849). It was written in 1834, late in the writer's life.

Synopsis
Helen tells the story of a young orphan, Helen Stanley, whose guardian, Dean Stanley, has squandered his fortune and left Helen without means of support. She is forced to take up residence with the local vicar, whose wife is astonished that none of the Stanleys' aristocratic friends have offered a refuge to her. Eventually, however, the Davenant family returns from abroad and invite Helen to their daughter's new home, Clarendon Park. (Cecilia Davenant has just married General Clarendon.) Helen journeys to join her dear friend Cecilia (a charming socialite), and the first half of the novel describes Helen's experiences among the most fortunate of Britain's elite under the tutelage of Lady Davenant, who in some ways favors Helen over her own daughter Cecilia.

In the second and more dramatic half of the novel, Lady Davenant departs with her husband, who has been named ambassador at the Court of St. Petersburg, Russia. Helen is left to the care of General Clarendon and Cecilia. By this time she is engaged to Granville Beauclerc, a young and handsome man who is another of Lady Davenant's favorites. All does not run smoothly for Helen, however. Before her marriage, Cecilia has carried on an amorous correspondence with Colonel d'Aubigny, a worthless roué who has since died. These letters reappear in a packet addressed to Cecilia's husband. Cecilia implores Helen to act as if the letters were addressed to her rather than to Cecilia. Helen, from misguided devotion to her friend and gratitude for Cecilia's kind hospitality, agrees to the deception. This first step leads to more and more serious consequences, until finally Helen's reputation is in tatters. Beauclerc is forced to fight a duel in defense of his fiancée, after which he must flee from England. Cecilia still refuses to recognize the letters as hers, out of fear of losing her own husband if she admits to the correspondence. The General is convinced that Helen is faithless. She refuses to stay where she is not respected and chooses exile in Wales with the General's sister, where she becomes dangerously ill. Even the birth of Cecilia's first child, a son, does not encourage her to confess to her husband, and Helen gives up all hope of exoneration. The dénouement comes when Lady Davenant, also dangerously ill, returns to London at the same time as the General finally discovers his wife's deception and vows to separate from Cecilia for life. Helen's character is redeemed, Beauclerc returns to England when his adversary recovers from his wounds, and the novel ends happily for all the protagonists with Lady Davenant saying that she is "now, and not till now, happy--perfectly happy in Love and Truth!"

Criticism
Here is what one biographer of Maria Edgeworth has to say about Helen.

"It was in 1830–when already past sixty years of age–that Miss Edgeworth set to work upon the last, and what, at the time it was written, was possibly the most successful of all her novels–namely, Helen. Any reader who will take it down from its shelf, and glance over it, will quickly perceive that it is a novel of a very much more modern type than any other by the same hand. In reading it we are aware that the eighteenth century has at last dropped out of sight, and that we are well out upon the nineteenth, not indeed as yet  'Victorian', but in a sort of midway region, on the road to that superior epoch."

References

External links

 
 

1834 British novels
Novels by Maria Edgeworth
19th-century Irish novels